Sergiyevsky (masculine), Sergiyevskaya (feminine), or Sergiyevskoye (neuter) is the name of several rural localities (settlements, khutors, selos, villages, and stanitsas) in Russia:
Sergiyevsky, Kolomensky District, Moscow Oblast, a settlement in Pestrikovskoye Rural Settlement of Kolomensky District of Moscow Oblast
Sergiyevsky, Yegoryevsky District, Moscow Oblast, a settlement under the administrative jurisdiction of the Town of Yegoryevsk in Yegoryevsky District of Moscow Oblast
Sergiyevsky, Ryazan Oblast, a settlement in Spassky Rural Okrug of Miloslavsky District of Ryazan Oblast
Sergiyevsky, Saratov Oblast, a settlement in Saratovsky District of Saratov Oblast
Sergiyevsky, Tula Oblast, a settlement in Prilepsky Rural Okrug of Leninsky District of Tula Oblast
Sergiyevsky, Voronezh Oblast, a khutor in Aleksandrovskoye Rural Settlement of Talovsky District of Voronezh Oblast
Sergiyevskoye, Republic of Adygea, a selo in Giaginsky District of the Republic of Adygea
Sergiyevskoye, Ivanovo Oblast, a village in Ivanovsky District of Ivanovo Oblast
Sergiyevskoye, Kursk Oblast, a selo in Sergiyevsky Selsoviet of Zolotukhinsky District of Kursk Oblast
Sergiyevskoye, Moscow Oblast, a selo in Pestrikovskoye Rural Settlement of Kolomensky District of Moscow Oblast
Sergiyevskoye, Livensky District, Oryol Oblast, a selo in Sergiyevsky Selsoviet of Livensky District of Oryol Oblast
Sergiyevskoye, Mtsensky District, Oryol Oblast, a selo in Voinsky Selsoviet of Mtsensky District of Oryol Oblast
Sergiyevskoye, Uritsky District, Oryol Oblast, a selo in Kotovsky Selsoviet of Uritsky District of Oryol Oblast
Sergiyevskoye, Lipyagovsky Rural Okrug, Miloslavsky District, Ryazan Oblast, a selo in Lipyagovsky Rural Okrug of Miloslavsky District of Ryazan Oblast
Sergiyevskoye, Spassky Rural Okrug, Miloslavsky District, Ryazan Oblast, a selo in Spassky Rural Okrug of Miloslavsky District of Ryazan Oblast
Sergiyevskoye, Stavropol Krai, a selo in Sergiyevsky Selsoviet of Grachyovsky District of Stavropol Krai
Sergiyevskoye, Kireyevsky District, Tula Oblast, a village in Bolshekalmyksky Rural Okrug of Kireyevsky District of Tula Oblast
Sergiyevskoye, Kurkinsky District, Tula Oblast, a selo in Sergiyevskaya Volost of Kurkinsky District of Tula Oblast
Sergiyevskoye, Tver Oblast, a village in Kalininsky District of Tver Oblast
Sergiyevskoye, Yaroslavl Oblast, a selo in Maymersky Rural Okrug of Uglichsky District of Yaroslavl Oblast
Sergiyevskaya, Krasnodar Krai, a stanitsa in Sergiyevsky Rural Okrug of Korenovsky District of Krasnodar Krai
Sergiyevskaya, Volgograd Oblast, a stanitsa in Sergiyevsky Selsoviet of Danilovsky District of Volgograd Oblast
Sergiyevskaya, Vologda Oblast, a village in Ramensky Selsoviet of Tarnogsky District of Vologda Oblast